The House at 21 West Cayuga Street in the village of Moravia in Cayuga County, New York is a historic home.  It is a -story, frame dwelling with a 1-story rear wing.  It was probably constructed between 1810 and 1830 as a vernacular interpretation of Federal style residential architecture.

It was listed on the National Register of Historic Places in 1995.

References

External links

Houses on the National Register of Historic Places in New York (state)
Federal architecture in New York (state)
Houses in Cayuga County, New York
National Register of Historic Places in Cayuga County, New York
Moravia (village), New York